In mathematics, specifically in measure theory, a Borel measure on  a topological space is a measure that is defined on all open sets (and thus on all Borel sets). Some authors require additional restrictions on the measure, as described below.

Formal definition
A Borel measure is any measure  defined on the σ-algebra of Borel sets. A few authors require in addition that  is locally finite, meaning that  for every compact set . If a Borel measure  is both inner regular and outer regular, it is called a regular Borel measure. If  is both inner regular, outer regular, and locally finite, it is called a Radon measure.

On the real line
The real line  with its usual topology is a locally compact Hausdorff space; hence we can define a Borel measure on it. This measure turns out to be the restriction to the Borel σ-algebra of the Lebesgue measure , which is a complete measure and is defined on the Lebesgue σ-algebra. The Lebesgue σ-algebra is actually the completion of the Borel σ-algebra, which means that it is the smallest σ-algebra that contains all the Borel sets and can be equipped with a complete measure. Also, the Borel measure and the Lebesgue measure coincide on the Borel sets (i.e.,  for every Borel measurable set, where  is the Borel measure described above).

Product spaces
If X and Y are second-countable, Hausdorff topological spaces, then the set of Borel subsets  of their product coincides with the product of the sets  of Borel subsets of X and Y. That is, the Borel functor 
  
from the category of second-countable Hausdorff spaces to the category of measurable spaces preserves finite products.

Applications

Lebesgue–Stieltjes integral

The Lebesgue–Stieltjes integral is the ordinary Lebesgue integral with respect to a measure known as the Lebesgue–Stieltjes measure, which may be associated to any function of bounded variation on the real line.  The Lebesgue–Stieltjes measure is a regular Borel measure, and conversely every regular Borel measure on the real line is of this kind.

Laplace transform

One can define the Laplace transform of a finite Borel measure μ on the real line by the Lebesgue integral

 

An important special case is where μ is a probability measure or, even more specifically, the Dirac delta function. In operational calculus, the Laplace transform of a measure is often treated as though the measure came from a distribution function f.  In that case, to avoid potential confusion, one often writes

 

where the lower limit of 0− is shorthand notation for

 

This limit emphasizes that any point mass located at 0 is entirely captured by the Laplace transform.  Although with the Lebesgue integral, it is not necessary to take such a limit, it does appear more naturally in connection with the Laplace–Stieltjes transform.

Hausdorff dimension and Frostman's lemma

Given a Borel measure μ on a metric space X such that μ(X) > 0 and μ(B(x, r)) ≤ rs holds for some constant s > 0 and for every ball B(x, r) in X, then the Hausdorff dimension dimHaus(X) ≥ s. A partial converse is provided by the Frostman lemma:

Lemma: Let A be a Borel subset of Rn, and let s > 0. Then the following are equivalent:
Hs(A) > 0, where Hs denotes the s-dimensional Hausdorff measure.
There is an (unsigned) Borel measure μ satisfying μ(A) > 0, and such that 
 
holds for all x ∈ Rn and r > 0.

Cramér–Wold theorem

It is used as a method for proving joint convergence results. The theorem is named after Harald Cramér and Herman Ole Andreas Wold.

References

Further reading
 Gaussian measure, a finite-dimensional Borel measure
 .
 
 
 
 Wiener's lemma   related

External links
 Borel measure at Encyclopedia of Mathematics

Measures (measure theory)